The People's Liberation Army National Defence University is a national public collegiate military university headquartered in Beijing, China with constituent and affiliated military academies nationwide. Established in 1985 by a military order of Deng Xiaoping, the university is under the "institutional leadership" of the Central Military Commission. The university is the highest military education institution of China.

The current president of the university is People's Liberation Army (PLA) lieutenant general Xiao Tianliang.

History 
The National Defense University originated from the Red Army teaching team founded by Mao Zedong in Jinggang Mountains in 1927. It has successively experienced the Chinese Workers and Peasants Red Army University and the Anti-Japanese Military and Political University in the war years, as well as the Higher Military Academy and the Military and Political University after the founding of the People’s Republic of China.

In December 1985, by an military order signed by Deng Xiaoping, then chairman of the Central Military Commission, the National Defense University was established by merging the People's Liberation Army's Military Academy, the Political Academy, and the Logistics Academy.

In July 2017, under the chairmanship of Xi Jinping, according to the order of the Central Military Commission, the former National Defense University, the Nanjing Institute of Political Science, the Xi'an Institute of Political Science, the PLA Academy of Art, the PLA Logistics Academy, the Shijiazhuang Ground Force Command Academy, the Armed Police Academy of Political Science, and some departments of the Equipment Academy merged to form the new National Defense University.

Events 
The university hosted visitors from Singapore and Australia as well as partnered with foreign firms such as Synopsys for technology transfer arrangements.

In 2015, the People's Liberation Army National Defence University formed a think tank called the China National Security Studies Centre.

See also
List of government-run higher-level national military academies
PLA Nanjing Political College

References

External links 

 

 
Military academies of China
People's Liberation Army
Educational institutions established in 1985
Military education and training in China
1985 establishments in China
Universities and colleges in Beijing